is  the former Head coach of the Gunma Crane Thunders in the Japanese Bj League.

Head coaching record

|-
| style="text-align:left;"|Gunma Crane Thunders
| style="text-align:left;"|2012
| 8||0||8|||| style="text-align:center;"| Fired|||-||-||-||
| style="text-align:center;"|-
|-

References

1962 births
Living people

Gunma Crane Thunders coaches
Japanese basketball coaches